Advance Australia Party may refer to:
Advance Australia Party (1988), a defunct political party
Advance Australia Party (2010), a defunct political party